Penitentes, or nieves penitentes (Spanish for "penitent snows"), are snow formations found at high altitudes. They take the form of elongated, thin blades of hardened snow or ice, closely spaced and pointing towards the general direction of the sun.

The name comes from the resemblance of a field of penitentes to a crowd of kneeling people doing penance. The formation evokes the tall, pointed habits and hoods worn by brothers of religious orders in the Processions of Penance during Spanish Holy Week. In particular, the brothers' hats are tall, narrow, and white, with a pointed top.

These spires of snow and ice grow over all glaciated and snow-covered areas in the Dry Andes above .

First description
Penitentes were first described in scientific literature by Charles Darwin in 1839. On March 22, 1835, he had to squeeze his way through snowfields covered in penitentes near the Piuquenes Pass, on the way from Santiago de Chile to the Argentine city of Mendoza, and reported the local belief (continuing to the present day) that they were formed by the strong winds of the Andes.

Formation
Louis Lliboutry noted that the key climatic condition behind the differential ablation that leads to the formation of penitentes is a dew point that remains below freezing. This combined with dry air will cause snow to sublimate. Once the process of differential ablation starts, the surface geometry of the evolving penitente produces a positive feedback mechanism, and radiation is trapped by multiple reflections between the walls. The hollows become almost a black body for radiation, while decreased wind leads to air saturation, increasing dew point temperature and the onset of melting. In this way peaks, where mass loss is due to sublimation alone, will remain, as well as the steep walls, which intercept only a minimum of solar radiation. In the troughs, the ablation is enhanced, leading to a downward growth of penitentes. A mathematical model of the process has been developed by Betterton, although the physical processes at the initial stage of penitente growth, from granular snow to micropenitentes, still remain unclear.  The effect of penitentes on the energy balance of the snow surface, and therefore their effect on snow melt and water resources has also been studied.

Non-terrestrial
According to a recent study, NASA's New Horizons mission has discovered penitentes on Pluto, in a region informally named Tartarus Dorsa.

Gallery

See also
 Hoar frost
 Rime ice
 Stone Forest
 Suncup (snow)

References

Further reading
 
  (Describes appearance and formation of these ablation features, with reference to those observed in eastern Pamir, U.S.S.K.)

External links
 
 "Spiky glaciers are slower to melt", New Scientist (March 7, 2007).

 Glaciology
 Snow or ice weather phenomena